Taaleem, which means 'education' in Arabic, is one of the largest education providers in the Middle East. Taaleem’s main activites are the development and management of early childhood, primary and secondary schools. Each education project offers international curricula including British, American, the International Baccalaureate, the International Primary Curriculum and a multi-lingual early childhood programme, the International Curriculum for Languages and Creative Arts.

Company history
Taaleem, formerly known as Beacon Education, was founded in Dubai, United Arab Emirates in 2004. Taaleem opened its first three schools and one pre-school in 2005, offering the American and British Curriculum, the International Baccalaureate Programme and International Curriculum for Languages and Creative Arts.

In 2007, National Bonds Corporation, which is owned by the Investment Corporation of Dubai, the investment arm of Dubai government, established Madaares "schools" to open and operate high quality schools in the region. In 2008, National Bonds and Madaares launched Taaleem.

Taaleem’s main activities include investment in development and operation of K-12 schools, and other supporting initiatives. The holding company, Madaares Private Joint Stock Company, owns 100% of Taaleem PJSC and Taaleem Management LLC (previously known as Beacon Management LLC). The company is governed by a nine-member Board of Directors chaired by H.E. Abdulrahman Al Saleh, Director General of the Department Of Finance, Government of Dubai.

In 2013, Taaleem appointed Rosamund Marshall as new Chief Executive Officer, taking over from Ziad Azzam, one of the founders of Beacon Education and now a member of the Board of Directors.

Taaleem schools
Taaleem owns nine private schools including pre-schools in Dubai, and one private school in the United Arab Emirates’ capital Abu Dhabi.

 Greenfield Community School
 Jumeira Baccalaureate School
 Uptown School
 Raha International School
 American Academy for Girls (previously Al-Mizhar American Academy)
 Dubai British School
 Dubai British Foundation
 Dubai British School, Jumeirah Park
 The Children's Garden, Green Community
 The Children's Garden Al Barsha 2

Accreditation and Authorization

Taaleem schools are either members of or have achieved full accreditation by the Council of International Schools and/or The New England Association of Schools and Colleges. All Taaleem International Baccalaureate Schools are IB World Schools and are authorized by any of the four IB programs or in the process of being authorized.

Taaleem Initiatives

In 2009, Taaleem teamed up with the International Baccalaureate to offer Primary Years Programme and Middle Years Programme professional development workshops in Dubai in cooperation with the IB, which are accessible to educators from all over the world. The International Baccalaureate is an international educational foundation headquartered in Geneva, Switzerland and founded in 1968, offering four educational programs for children aged 3–19.

In 2012, Taaleem launched the Taaleem Poetry Award as part of the Emirates International Literature Festival, an annual event in Dubai held under the patronage of His Highness Sheikh Mohammed Bin Rashid Al Maktoum, The Vice-President and Prime Minister of the UAE and Ruler of Dubai.

References

Education companies of the United Arab Emirates
Companies based in Dubai